The untitled first studio album by the Spanish rock band Triana, commonly known as El patio, was released on 14 April 1975.
At first it was a commercial failure but as the band became popular the album sales increased.

The first CD issue dates from 1988, released under the Fonomusic label; the album was also released in the US by Warner Music in 2003.

Track listing

Reception 
El Patio is one of the most acclaimed Spanish rock albums of all time, for both critics and the public.
Albums reviews
Top 100 Spanish albums of the 20th century according to Rockdelux magazine. (#15)
"Los 250: Essential Albums of All Time Latin Alternative - Rock Iberoamericano," (#43)
Top 50 Spanish rock albums according to Rolling Stone. (#23)
Top 100 Spanish pop albums ever according to Efe Eme. (#25)

Staff 
Jesús de la Rosa Luque – vocals, keyboards
J. J. Palacios "Tele" – drums, percussion 
Eduardo Rodríguez – guitar
Additional personnel
Manolo Rosa – bass
Antonio García de Diego – electric guitar
Máximo Moreno - artwork

References

External links 
Triana on Discogs

1975 debut albums
Spanish-language albums
Triana (band) albums